The Count of Monte Cristo is a novel by Alexandre Dumas.

The Count of Monte Cristo may also refer to:

Films
 The Count of Monte Cristo (1908 film), a silent film starring Hobart Bosworth
 The Count of Monte Cristo (1913 film), a silent film starring James O'Neill
 The Count of Monte Cristo (1918 series), a silent-film serial starring Léon Mathot
 Monte Cristo (1922 film) (aka The Count of Monte Cristo), a silent film starring John Gilbert
 Monte Cristo (1929 film) (aka The Count of Monte-Cristo in the US), a French silent film starring Jean Angelo
 The Count of Monte Cristo (1934 film), starring Robert Donat
 The Count of Monte Cristo (1942 film) (Spanish: El Conde de Montecristo), starring Arturo de Córdova
 The Count of Monte Cristo (1943 film), starring Pierre Richard-Willm
 The Count of Monte Cristo (1953 film) (Spanish: El Conde de Montecristo), starring by Jorge Mistral
 The Count of Monte Cristo (1954 film), starring Jean Marais
 The Count of Monte Cristo (1961 film), starring Louis Jourdan
 The Return of Monte Cristo (1968 film), an adaptation set in the twentieth century, starring Paul Barge
 The Count of Monte Cristo (1973 TV movie), a 1973 animated television TV movie produced by Hanna-Barbera Productions
 The Count of Monte Cristo (1975 film), starring Richard Chamberlain
 The Count of Monte-Cristo (1991 film), a 1991 animated television film produced by Burbank Animation Studios
 The Count of Monte Cristo (1997 film), a 1997 animated direct-to-video film produced by Blye Migicovsky Productions and Phoenix Animation Studios
 The Count of Monte Cristo (2002 film), starring Jim Caviezel

Television
 The Count of Monte Cristo (1956 TV series), starring George Dolenz
 The Count of Monte Cristo (1958 teleplay), starring Hurd Hatfield on the DuPont Show of the Month
 The Count of Monte Cristo (1964 TV series), starring Alan Badel
 Greven av Monte Cristo, in the List of Norwegian television series
 , starring Jacques Weber
 The Prisoner of Château d'If (English title: The Count of Monte Cristo), a 1988 Soviet miniseries
 The Count of Monte Cristo (1998 miniseries), starring Gérard Depardieu
 Gankutsuou: The Count of Monte Cristo, a 2004–2005 anime television series

Music
 The Count of Monte Cristo (musical), a 2009 musical based on the novel
 The Count of Monte Cristo (James Behr musical)
 "The Count of Monte Christo", a Noisettes song from the album What's the Time Mr Wolf

Radio
 The Count of Monte Cristo (radio program), an old-time radio program based on the novel

See also
 The Countess of Monte Cristo (disambiguation)
 Monte Cristo (disambiguation)

The Count of Monte Cristo